The ningu (Labeo victorianus) is a species of ray-finned fish in the family Cyprinidae.
It is found in the Lake Victoria basin in Burundi, Kenya, Tanzania, and Uganda. Its natural habitats are rivers, swamps, freshwater lakes, freshwater marshes, and inland deltas. It is threatened by a loss of habitat due to pollution, siltation and drainage as agriculture expands in the Lake Victoria basin, by overfishing on their breeding migrations and by introduced alien fish.

References

Labeo
Fish described in 1901
Taxonomy articles created by Polbot